Nina Bradley may refer to:

 Nina Leopold Bradley (1917–2011), American conservationist, researcher and writer
 Nina Bradley (boxer) (born 1987), British boxer